Cardamine flexuosa, commonly known as wavy bittercress or wood bitter-cress, is an herbaceous annual, biennial, or short-lived perennial plant in the  cabbage family (Brassicaceae).

Description
This is a small flowering plant growing to a height of no more than 30 cm, usually perennial, with few short, erect stems. The leaves pinnate, mostly at the base, each with about 5 pairs of rounded leaflets. Flowers very small, white, 3 – 4 mm across with 6 stamens. Fruits of C. flexuosa generally do not overtop the flowers, a feature distinguishing it from Cardamine hirsuta.

Distribution
Common throughout the British Isles and Europe.

Habitat
In Ireland common in woods shady and damp places.

Uses
In Northeast Indian State, Manipur, it is eaten and often used as garnishing Eromba and known as Chaantruk.

References

flexuosa
Flora of Europe